Terveet Kädet are a Finnish hardcore punk band, the first in Finland. The group was founded in Tornio in January 1980. They have had a major influence on bands from all over the world, especially in Brazil (which some have claimed was because of a member from the leading band Olho Seco and his enthusiasm and connections to that country's scene).   Max Cavalera of Sepultura and Soulfly has mentioned Terveet Kädet as one of his all-time favourite bands.

The band's line-up changed several times, and the singer Veli-Matti "Läjä" Äijälä was the only permanent member. The band announced on its Facebook page in March 2016 that it was disbanded. Svart Records released complete works of the band from 1980's as an omnibus release "TK Pop 1980-1989" in 2019. Läjä Äijälä's current band Lapin Helvetti played a short tour to promote the release in summer and autumn 2019 playing only songs from the release. 

The name Terveet Kädet means "Healthy Hands".

Discography

Singles and EPs 
 Rock laahausta vastaan (Ikbal 003, 1980)
 II (Ikbal 004, 1981)
 Ääretön joulu (Poko/Kädet 105, 1982)
 Kädet Suojelee (1983)
 Oma koloni (1988)
 Anno Domini (1989)
 Live Kemi 1982 (1989)
 Unkind (1990)
 Message (Kill City/Propaganda, 1990)
 Six Song (HCR, 1991)
 Slow Promotion (Mad Rat, 1991)
 Bizarre Domination (1992)
 The Horse (A.A.R., 1994)
 Pahan voima (A.A.R., 1995)
 Bondage And Anguished Life (Healthy Hands Records, 1995)

Studio albums 
 Terveet Kädet  (LP, Propaganda Records, 1983)
 Halloween (LP, re-issue of "I" Rock-O-Rama/Germany, 1983)
 Black God (LP, Propaganda/R-O-R licence Germany), 1984)
 The Horse (LP, 1985; Power It Up, 2006)
 Sign of the cross (CD, A.A.R., 1995)
 Doomed Alien Race (CD, A.A.R., 1997)
 The Ultimate Pain (CD, Solardisk, 1999)
 Non Ultra Descriptica (CD, Solardisk, 2000)
 Ihmisen poika, pedon poika (CD, Longplay Music/Kämäset levyt, 2009)
 Musta hetki (CD & LP, Longplay Music, 2012)
 Lapin helvetti (CD & LP, Svart Records / SPHC, 2015)
 UGH!!! Terveet Kädet elävänä (CD & LP, Longplay Music/Playground, 2016)

Live albums 
 Knock-out (tape, BCT, 1984)
 Leather Enslavement (LP, Klayster Records, 1998)
 Pissaa ja paskaa  (CD, Propaganda Records PRO 2026, 2006)
 UGH!!! Terveet Kädet elävänä (CD & LP, Longplay Music 2012)

Compilation albums 
 Yalta Hi-Life (LP, 1984, with Varaus, Äpärät, Aivoproteesi, Kaaos, Kansanturvamusiikkikomissio)
 PROPAGANDA (LP, Kill City/Propaganda, 1991)
 Hardcore Brutality (CD, Grand Theft Audio, 1996)
 Kumia Ja Verta - 1987 Kokoelma (CD,  Alternative Action, 1996)
 Ääretön Propaganda (CD, Propaganda Records PRO 2001, 1999)
 Onnellisia Kytkentöjä 1980-2000 (CD, Solardisk, 2002)
 Deep Wounds (CD, Usina De Sangue Records, 2002)
 Ääretön Propaganda (LP & bonus-EP, Propaganda Records/Höhnie Records, 2007)
 TK Pop 1980-1989 (5LP/2CD, Svart Records, 2019)

Members

Last Line-Up

Veli-Matti "Läjä" Äijälä – vocals, lyrics (1980–2016)
 Ilari – guitar (2006–2016)
 Jani – bass (2011–2016)
 Aki – drums (2011–2016)

Past members

Drums
 Walde (1983–1984, died in 1984)
 Tilli (1984–2000)
 Luttinen (2000–2006)
 Peedro – drums (1980–1983, 2006–2011)

Bass
 Piäsky (1980–1989)
 Kähkönen (1989–1990)
 Lene (1990–1998, 2006-2011)
 Puksu (1998–2006)

Guitar
 Tiimo Viik (1980–1985)
 Weega (1985–1986)
 A. W. Yrjänä (1986–1988)
 Lene (2000–2006)
 Maike (1989–2006)

References

External links
 TERVEET KADET | Listen and Stream Free Music, Albums, New Releases, Photos, Videos
 Läjä Äijälä's Myspace page can be found at Veli-Matti Aijala (lajatk) on Myspace
 Propaganda Records

Finnish hardcore punk groups
Musical groups established in 1980